Seidu Bancey (born 15 May 1990) is a professional footballer who plays as a striker for ES Zarzis in Tunisia.

Club career
Bancey signed for Ebusua Dwarfs in the 2010–2011 season and played for the club until the end of the 2011–2012 season and Bancey signed for Asante Kotoko on 1 July 2012. He was the highest goal scorer for the 2013/2014 season in the Ghanaian Premier league.

Egypt
He signed a two-year contract with Egyptian Premier club Smouha Sporting Club in September 2014, but mutually agreed to terminate the contract, due to the situation in Egypt.

International career
Bancey competed with the Ghana national under-23 football team in the 2011 CAF U-23 Championship qualification and 2014 African Nations Championship.

References

1990 births
Footballers from Accra
Living people
Ghanaian footballers
Ghana international footballers
Association football forwards
Olympic footballers of Ghana
Asante Kotoko S.C. players
Ghana A' international footballers
2014 African Nations Championship players
Expatriate footballers in Tunisia
Expatriate footballers in Lebanon
Expatriate footballers in Egypt
Ghanaian expatriate sportspeople in Tunisia
Ghanaian expatriate sportspeople in Egypt
Ghanaian expatriate sportspeople in Lebanon
Ghanaian expatriate footballers
Al Nabi Chit SC players
Lebanese Premier League players